Brachylaima is a genus of trematodes. It has recently been discovered that it can infest the gastrointestinal tract of human beings.

Epidemiology and transmission
The first documented case of Brachylaima infestation (known as brachylaimiasis) in a human was in 1996, with 8 subsequent cases in the next 4 years. Diagnosis has spread from Australia to other parts of the world, such as the Spanish cities of Barcelona, Bilbao, Madrid, Tudela, Valencia, and Zaragoza. In 2020, it was reported that snails in France were also infected by metacercariae of two species of Brachylaima.

Transmission is via ingestion of infested undercooked land snails, Cornu aspersum (Pulmonata: Stylommatophora). The snail is the second intermediate host in the terrestrial life cycle of Brachylaima spp., which harbors unencysted metacercariae in its kidneys (Other intermediate hosts include, Cochlicella acuta Cernuella virgata and Theba pisana). Definitive hosts of this species include humans, mice, various species of birds and reptiles. It was first believed that the infection of humans was from children who had purposely eaten the snails, and adults have accidentally ingested snails on vegetables and become infected. Though this may be the case in some parts of the world, it has been shown that humans actively ingest these snails as a source of food in some areas.
One study showed that the Spanish city of Tudela had a very high prevalence of the parasite in the snails that were sold as food, though this prevalence fluctuates throughout the year, with the peak season being autumn. This prevalence has become a public concern in many Spanish countries due to the spread of brachylaimiasis. 
Eggs of this species can remain viable in feces/soil for up to twelve months. The sporocyst infection is 7–10 weeks after the eggs have been ingested.

Clinical features
Clinical features have varied from recurrent short-lived episodic abdominal pain to recurrent severe watery diarrhea, which has a 5-10% mortality rate 

Cardiac arrhythmias associated with heart failure refractory to treatment were present in a child infected and completely resolved with anti-helminthic treatment.

Diagnosis

Diagnosis is by examination of stools, in search of the eggs of the parasite, but is highly dependent on the skill and technique of the laboratory worker, with previous diagnoses missed by other hospital labs and only noted after examination at The Queen Elizabeth Hospital in Woodville, Adelaide, South Australia.

Treatment
Treatment with a round of praziquantel results in complete resolution of symptoms and clearance of eggs from stools.

References

Diplostomida
Parasitic helminths of humans
Digenea genera